Philippa Lucy Hinchley (born 7 April 1966) is an English actress who played Elaine Fenwick in Coronation Street. She has also been in The Bill, Bugs, Doctors, Holby City and EastEnders.

She appeared in the one-off drama Z for Zachariah, part of the last run of the BBC's Play For Today series in 1984. Acting opposite Anthony Andrews, she took the role of teenager Ann Burden, one of apparently only two survivors of a nuclear holocaust.

One of her earliest TV roles was as a teenaged holidaymaker in Michael Palin's drama East of Ipswich (1986), set in Southwold in the 1950s. She also appeared in the films Secret Places (1984), Dead Man's Folly (1986) and The Dressmaker (1988), and on TV in Last of the Summer Wine, People Like Us and Touch.

Hinchley was born in London.

References

1966 births
English soap opera actresses
Living people
Actresses from London
English television actresses
English comics writers
English thriller writers
Female comics writers